Attorney General Sewell may refer to:

Henry Sewell (1807–1879), Attorney-General of New Zealand
Jonathan Sewell (1766–1839), Attorney-General of Lower Canada
Robert Sewell (lawyer) (1751–1828), Attorney General of Jamaica

See also
Attorney General Seawell (disambiguation)
General Sewell (disambiguation)